Peta Jane Murgatroyd (born 14 July 1986) is a New Zealand-born Australian and American professional Latin dancer. She performed in the international tour of the dance production Burn the Floor, including its Broadway run. She is best known for her appearances on the American edition of Dancing with the Stars, which she and her partners have won twice.

Early life
Murgatroyd was born in Auckland, New Zealand, but moved to Australia when she was 18 months old; as a result, she considers herself more of an Australian. She was raised in Perth, Western Australia, and started studying classical ballet at age 4. She trained for 12 years under former principal dancer of the Kirov Ballet, Madame Lubov Nikonorenko. An ankle injury at 16 years old forced Murgatroyd to give up ballet. She then picked up Latin dancing.

Career
Within months of beginning ballroom training, Murgatroyd became the W.A. Amateur Latin State Champion in 2002 and won the title again in 2003. She placed second in the Great World City Championships. Success at other competitions followed quickly; she was a semi-finalist in the Lion City Championships in Singapore and was a finalist in the Australian Open Championships. She placed third in the world at the Blackpool Dance Festival Youth Under 21 Latin competitions in 2005.

In 2018, she starred alongside Robert Krantz in the heartwarming, faith-based movie Faith, Hope & Love where she played the owner of a dance studio who is paired with a widower of two girls, in an amateur dancing contest.

Burn the Floor

Murgatroyd joined the cast of Burn the Floor in 2004, touring with them around the world for six years. When Burn the Floor landed on Broadway in August 2009, Murgatroyd was the lead female dancer.

Dancing with the Stars
Murgatroyd joined the cast of Dancing with the Stars in 2011 as a member of the dance troupe in season 12. She became a regular member of the professional cast as of season 13.

Dancing with the Stars (Season 13)

In season 13, Murgatroyd competed on the show as a professional with basketball player Metta World Peace. They were the first couple eliminated off the show.

Dancing with the Stars (Season 14) 

In 2012, Murgatroyd was again featured as a professional dancer competing on season 14 as the partner of football player Donald Driver. On 22 May, it was announced that the couple was the winner of the competition.  She is the second professional to win after finishing last the prior season, after Kym Johnson.

Dancing with the Stars (Season 15)

For season 15, Murgatroyd was partnered with actor and season 8 runner up Gilles Marini. They ended up in sixth place.

Dancing with the Stars (Season 16)

In 2013, Murgatroyd was again featured as a professional dancer competing on season 16 as the partner of The Bachelor star Sean Lowe. They landed in sixth place.

Dancing with the Stars (Season 17)

For season 17, Murgatroyd was paired with Pretty Little Liars actor Brant Daugherty. They were the sixth couple eliminated on 4 November 2013.

Dancing with the Stars (Season 18)

In 2014, Murgatroyd was again featured as a professional dancer competing on season 18 partnered with  Big Time Rush member James Maslow. They made it to the finale but came in fourth place.

1The guest judges were Robin Roberts (Week 3), Julianne Hough (Week 4), Donny Osmond (Week 5), Redfoo (Week 6), Ricky Martin (Week 7), Abby Lee Miller (Week 8) and Kenny Ortega (Week 9).

2For this week only, as part of the "Partner Switch-Up" week, Maslow performed with Cheryl Burke instead of Murgatroyd; Murgatroyd danced a rumba with Olympic ice dancing champion Charlie White, scoring a 33 (7, 8, 9, 9).

Dancing with the Stars (Season 19)

For season 19, Murgatroyd paired with comedian and actor Tommy Chong. The couple made it to the Semi-finals, but were then eliminated and finished in 5th place.

1Week 3 score given by guest judge Kevin Hart in place of Goodman.

2The American public scored the dance in place of Goodman with the averaged score being counted alongside the three other judges.

3This week only, for "Partner Switch-Up" week, Chong performed with Emma Slater instead of Murgatroyd. Murgatroyd performed with Jonathan Bennett.

4Score given by guest judge Jessie J in place of Goodman.

5Score given by guest judge Pitbull in place of Goodman.

Dancing with the Stars (Season 20)

For season 20, Murgatroyd was partnered with football player Michael Sam. The couple was eliminated on Week 4 and finished in 10th place.

Dancing with the Stars (Season 21)

On 19 August 2015, Good Morning America announced Murgatroyd would be one of the pro dancers on the upcoming season 21 of Dancing with the Stars. However, before the season premiered, Murgatroyd was forced to sit this season out due to an ongoing ankle injury. Murgatroyd told People magazine she had four torn ligaments and a floating piece of bone in her ankle which would require surgery and six to eight weeks of recovery time. Murgatroyd would have been partnered with singer Andy Grammer.

Murgatroyd returned to the show during the season 21 semifinals, performing a salsa trio with Backstreet Boy Nick Carter and Sharna Burgess. The group received a score of 30 for the dance.

Dancing with the Stars (Season 22)

Murgatroyd returned for season 22 and was partnered with deaf model and actor Nyle DiMarco. On 24 May 2016, Murgatroyd and DiMarco were crowned the season's champions.

Murgatroyd did not return for season 23 due to her pregnancy.

1 Score given by guest judge Zendaya. 2 For this week only, as part of "America's Switch Up", DiMarco performed with Sharna Burgess instead of Murgatroyd. Murgatroyd performed with Doug Flutie. 3 Score given by guest judge Maksim Chmerkovskiy.4 Due to Tonioli being the judge coaching DiMarco's team during the team-up dance, the viewers scored the dance in his place with the averaged score being counted alongside the remaining judges.

Dancing with the Stars (Season 24)

In February 2017, Murgatroyd and her fiancé Maksim Chmerkovskiy announced they would both return. She was partnered with The Bachelor star Nick Viall.

1 Score given by guest judge Nick Carter2 Score given by guest judge Mandy Moore

Dancing with the Stars (Season 25)

Murgatroyd returned once again for season 25 and was paired with 98 Degrees singer Nick Lachey.

1 Score from guest judge Shania Twain.

Dancing with the Stars (Season 28)

Murgatroyd returned to the show after a two-season hiatus and was paired with former basketball player Lamar Odom.

1 Score given by guest judge Leah Remini.

Dancing with the Stars (Season 29)

Murgatroyd returned for season 29 and was paired with former NFL player Vernon Davis.

Dancing with the Stars (Season 31)

Murgatroyd returned to the show after a one-season hiatus and was paired with actor Jason Lewis. They were the first couple eliminated from the competition.

Dancing with the Stars: Live! 

In April 2015, it was announced Murgatroyd would take part in the Dancing with the Stars: Live! "Perfect Ten" tour during the summer of 2015. On 25 June 2015 the official Dancing with the Stars Twitter account announced Murgatroyd would be taking a short break from the tour due to an ankle injury.

Murgatroyd again joined the Dancing with the Stars: Live! for the "Dance All Night" tour in winter 2015–2016. The tour was scheduled to stop in 43 cities.

Sway: A Dance Trilogy
In 2014 Murgatroyd started performing in Sway: A Dance Trilogy in Westbury, New York alongside Maksim Chmerkovskiy. Chmerkovskiy credits his father Sasha with the idea for Sway. Sway is a live ballroom dance show starring Maksim, his brother Valentin, and Tony Dovolani. The show also features Murgatroyd, other professional dancers from Dancing with the Stars and So You think You Can Dance, and dance instructors from Dance with Me studios.

Personal life
Murgatroyd dated Australian professional ballroom dancer and former DWTS cast member Damian Whitewood for five years before breaking up in early 2012.

She had been dating DWTS pro Maksim Chmerkovskiy off and on since 2012. In 2015, Chmerkovskiy confirmed he and Murgatroyd were dating again. Chmerkovskiy and Murgatroyd became engaged on 5 December 2015, when he proposed while onstage for a performance of Sway: A Dance Trilogy in Miami, Florida. Their son, Shai, was born on 4 January 2017. The two were married on 8 July 2017 at Oheka Castle in Long Island, New York. In June 2022, Murgatroyd revealed that she suffered three miscarriages between 2020 and 2021 and that she was undergoing invitro fertilization to try to have another child. In early 2023, it was revealed that she is pregnant with the couple's second child after experiencing a natural conception. 

On 10 October 2019, she was sworn in as a US citizen.

References

External links 

1986 births
Living people
21st-century Australian dancers
Australian ballroom dancers
Australian emigrants to the United States
Australian female dancers
Dancing with the Stars (American TV series) winners
Naturalized citizens of the United States
New Zealand emigrants to Australia
People from Auckland
People from Perth, Western Australia